Virgil and Vergil are the most common modern English names used for the Roman poet Publius Vergilius Maro (70 BC–19 BC).

Virgil, Vergil, Virgilius, or Vergilius may also refer to:

People 
 Virgil (name), a list of people named Virgil

Fictional characters and stage names 
 Virgil, a character from the television series The Walking Dead
 Virgil, AI character from the TV series Crash Zone
 Vergil, a character from the Devil May Cry franchise
 Virgil, genius orangutan from Battle for the Planet of the Apes
 Virgil, character of Mike Jones, an American professional wrestler, in the World Wrestling Federation
 Virgil, a character from Xena: Warrior Princess
 Virgil Tracy, pilot of Thunderbird 2 in the TV series Thunderbirds
 Virgil, character from the film True Romance
 Virgil Hawkins, aka Static, from DC Comics
 Captain Virgil Hilts, a character in The Great Escape
 Virgil Tibbs, character from In the Heat of the Night
 Virgil, joint main antagonist in The Warriors
 Virgil, supporting character in Left 4 Dead 2
 Vergil, AI character in Halo 3: ODST
 Virgil, playable character in Arcanum: Of Steamworks and Magick Obscura
 Virgil, AI character in Portal Stories: Mel
 Virgil Caine, protagonist in the song "The Night They Drove Old Dixie Down" by The Band
 Virgil Walsh, a minor character in Trinity Blood
 Virgil, a character in Mighty Max
 Virgil, a non-playable character in Fallout 4
 Virgil, a crewed subterranean drilling vessel in The Core
 Virgil "Bud" Brigman, a main character in the film The Abyss
 Virgil, a main character in the YouTube series Sanders Sides

Movies
 Virgil (film), a 2005 movie directed by Mabrouk El Mechri

Places 
Canada
 Virgil, Ontario

United States
 Virgil, Illinois
 Virgil, Kansas
 Virgil, New York, town
 Virgil (CDP), New York, census-designated place within the town
 Virgil, South Dakota
 Virgil, West Virginia
 Virgil Middle School, Los Angeles, California

Other 
 Sanctus Virgilius, student society
 Virgil C. Summer Nuclear Generating Station, an American nuclear power station
 Virgil (bucking horse) #13 Two-time bareback horse of the year
 Virgil (horse), American thoroughbred